Darrylia clendenini is a species of sea snail, a marine gastropod mollusk in the family Horaiclavidae.

Description

Distribution

References

clendenini
Gastropods described in 2008